Nainwal Khalsa is a small village located in the Punjab region of Pakistan.

Location

Language
Punjabi is the native spoken language, but Urdu is also widely understood.

References

Villages in Punjab, Pakistan